Julius Augustus Wayland (April 26, 1854 – November 10, 1912) was a Midwestern US socialist during the Progressive Era. He is most noted for publishing Appeal to Reason, a socialist publication often deemed to be the most important socialist periodical of the time.

Early life
Julius Wayland was born in Versailles, Indiana, on April 26, 1854. As an infant, his father and four of his siblings died in a cholera epidemic. His early years were spent in abject poverty and he was forced to find work after only two years of schooling. He then apprenticed to a printer in his home town.

Career
Wayland became owner of the Versailles Gazette in 1874. As a result of reading books such as Laurence Gronlund's The Cooperative Commonwealth and Edward Bellamy's Looking Backward, Wayland became a socialist. His writings created tensions with home-town conservatives and he fled Versailles to avoid lynching.

Moving to Pueblo, Colorado, before, Wayland started a radical periodical, after being radicalized by pamphlets given to him by an Italian cobbler.The Coming Nation, which quickly became the most popular socialist newspaper in America. At this point, he helped found a utopian settlement, the Ruskin Colony in Dickson County, Tennessee. In July 1895, he left Ruskin and moved to Kansas City, Missouri, where in August 1895, he started another socialist journal, Appeal to Reason. Then, in 1897, he moved to Girard, Kansas. At first a mixture of articles and extracts from works by well-known socialists and radicals, Appeal to Reason began to publish writings by many of the prominent young socialists and reformers of the era, including Jack London, "Mother" Jones, Upton Sinclair, and Eugene Debs. Circulation soared, reaching 150,000 in 1902. In 1904, Appeal to Reason commissioned Upton Sinclair to write a novel about immigrant workers in the Chicago meatpacking houses. Sinclair's novel, titled The Jungle, appeared in 1905 as a serial in Appeal to Reason.

Personal life and death
With his first wife Etta Bevan (1858–1898) and second wife Pearl Hunt (1871–1911), Wayland resided in a historic house in Girard. Despite being a socialist, he became a millionaire.

During the night of June 8, 1911, the 57-year old Wayland, his 39-year old wife Pearl Hunt Wayland, and a family friend and her child, were returning to the Wayland residence after an evening's drive. With J.A. at the wheel, speed was increased to about 20 miles per hour as the car headed home. Tragically, due to mechanical failure the steering wheel became disengaged from the steering shaft and the car slammed into a telephone pole, ejecting Mrs. Wayland, who suffered severe injuries to her head and torso. Pearl Wayland was taken home and a doctor called, but she died of her injuries about five hours later.

Wayland committed suicide by shooting himself with a gun on November 10, 1912 in his Girard home. He had been depressed by the recent death of his wife, his failure to convince a majority of Americans of the merits of socialism, and the smear campaign mounted against him by the conservative press. Afterward, his children and the Appeal to Reason editor Fred Warren successfully sued for damages from newspapers that had published libelous material about Wayland.

Works

 Leaves of Life: A Story of Twenty Years of Socialist Agitation. Girard, KS: Appeal to Reason, 1912.

References

Further reading
 Tim Davenport, "The Appeal to Reason: Forerunner of Haldeman-Julius Publications", Corvallis, OR: Big Blue Newsletter, No. 3 (2004 Q-III).
 George Allen England, The Story of the Appeal. Girard, KS: Appeal to Reason, 1913.
 Howard H. Quint, "Julius A. Wayland, Pioneer Socialist Propagandist," Mississippi Valley Historical Review, vol. 35, no. 4 (March 1949), pp. 585–606. In JSTOR

1854 births
1912 suicides
People from Versailles, Indiana
American socialists
American newspaper publishers (people)
Suicides by firearm in Kansas
19th-century American businesspeople